Taylor Henderson is the debut studio album by Taylor Henderson, the runner-up of the fifth season of The X Factor Australia, released through Sony Music Australia on 29 November 2013. The album debuted at number one on the ARIA Albums Chart and was certified Platinum by the Australian Recording Industry Association.

Background
After finishing second in the fifth season of The X Factor Australia in 2013, Henderson signed a recording contract with Sony Music Australia. It was announced on 8 November 2013 that Henderson would be releasing his self-titled debut album. The album contains his debut single "Borrow My Heart" along with ten recorded versions of songs he performed on The X Factor.

Critical reception
Ahead of the album's release, Renowned for Sound published a five-star review which praised Henderson's time on The X Factor Australia as being "the most versatile and well-rounded contestant on the show". The article states about the album and Henderson's performance: "Taylor Henderson has a voice that you can’t help but want to listen to, no matter what he’s singing. Part of what makes him so exceptional is that his voice always has the right tone for the right song, and doesn’t make the mistake of over-singing like so many others".

Track listing

Charts

Weekly charts

Year-end charts

Certifications

Release history

See also
List of number-one albums of 2013 (Australia)

References

2013 debut albums
Taylor Henderson albums
Sony Music Australia albums